The Miombo blue-eared starling (Lamprotornis elisabeth), also known as the southern blue-eared glossy-starling, is a species of starling in the family Sturnidae. It is found in Botswana, the Democratic Republic of the Congo, Kenya, Malawi, Mozambique, Namibia, Tanzania, Uganda, Zambia, and Zimbabwe.

References

Miombo blue-eared starling
Birds of Southern Africa
Miombo blue-eared starling
Taxonomy articles created by Polbot
Taxobox binomials not recognized by IUCN